Vernon Center is a city in Blue Earth County, Minnesota, United States, along the Blue Earth River. The population was 328 at the 2020 census. It is part of the Mankato-North Mankato Metropolitan Statistical Area.

Geography

U.S. Route 169 serves as a main route in the community.

Demographics

2010 census
At the 2010 census, the city had 332 people, 132 households and 90 families. The racial makeup of the city was 98.8% White, 0.9% African American, and 0.3% from two or more races. Hispanic or Latino of any race were 1.8% of the population.

36.4% of 132 households had children under the age of 18 living in them, 59.1% were married couples living together, 7.6% had a female householder with no husband present, 1.5% had a male householder with no wife present, and 31.8% were non-families. 25.8% of all households were made up of individuals, and 12.8% had someone living alone who was 65 years of age or older. The average household size was 2.52 and the average family size was 3.11.

The median age was 34.4 years. 29.2% of residents were under the age of 18; 4.7% were between the ages of 18 and 24; 31.2% were from 25 to 44; 23.4% were from 45 to 64; and 11.1% were 65 years of age or older. The population were 46.7% male and 53.3% female.

2000 census
At the 2000 census, the city's population comprised 359 people, 132 households and 99 families, with a population density of 727.2 per square mile (282.9/km). The racial makeup of the city was 99.72% White and 0.28% Pacific Islander. Hispanic or Latino of any race were 1.39% of the population.

40.2% of 132 households had children under the age of 18 living in them, 68.9% were married couples living together, 4.5% had a female householder with no husband present, and 25.0% were non-families. 22.7% of all households were made up of individuals, and 14.4% had someone living alone who was 65 years of age or older. The average household size was 2.72 and the average family size was 3.14.

29.0% of the population were under the age of 18, 6.4% from 18 to 24, 27.6% from 25 to 44, 21.7% from 45 to 64, and 15.3% who were 65 years of age or older. The median age was 34 years. For every 100 females, there were 92.0 males. For every 100 females age 18 and over, there were 100.8 males.

The median household income was $50,703 and the median family income was $56,875. Males had a median income of $34,500 compared with $21,806 for females. The per capita income for the city was $20,693. None of the families and 1.5% of the population were living below the poverty line, including no under eighteens and 1.8% of those over 64.

History
Vernon Center was platted in 1857. It was named after Mount Vernon, the estate of George Washington.

On the morning of October 25, 2005, the grain elevator in downtown Vernon Center, filled with 200,000 bushels (5,000 metric tons) of corn, exploded, injuring six people.

Notable person
Benjamin Tibbets Kemerer, Episcopal bishop, was born in Vernon Center.

References

External links
Fictional short story takeoff on "Two Gentlemen from Verona" called "Two Guys from Vernon Center".

Cities in Blue Earth County, Minnesota
Cities in Minnesota
Mankato – North Mankato metropolitan area